Polysiphonia ceramiaeformis, also called banded siphon weed, is a small red algae (Rhodophyta), in the genus Polysiphonia.

Description
This small red algae lacks a clearly to be seen main axis. Each branch is formed of axial cells with 10 - 12 periaxial cells of equal length, with forcipate incurved tips. It is densely branched and attached by tangled prostrate axes. All axes are ecorticate. The rhizoids are numerous

Reproduction
The plants are dioecious. The alga bears spermatangial branches on a cylindrical axis. Cystocarps are oval with a narrow ostiole. The tetraspores cells divide to forms cells in fours, these occur in a spiral series.

Habitat
In pools at low water in sheltered sites.

Distribution
Very rare on the British Isles. Recorded from a few sites in Dorset, also recorded from north west France and the Mediterranean.

References

Rhodomelaceae